Adelaide de Morais Barros (18481911) was the wife of Prudente de Morais, the 3rd President of Brazil and the country's first civilian president. She was the "first lady" of the country between 1894 and 1898.

Early life
Adelaide Benvinda da Silva Gordo de Morais Barros was born in Santos, in the state of São Paulo, Brazil on 17 September 1848. She was the daughter of a lieutenant colonel of the Brazilian National Guard, Antônio José da Silva Gordo and his second wife, Ana Brandina de Barros. Through her mother, Adelaide was a distant descendant of several European aristocrats and monarchs. Her father owned a large farm near Santos, and was a major coffee producer and a leading political figure. Among her half-brothers was the politician .

Marriage and family

Barros met Prudente de Morais in her home city of Piracicaba in São Paulo state, where he had become a lawyer. They married in her parents' home on 28 May 1866, with the nuptials being a major social event of the time, partly because it was a double ceremony, with her twin sister, Maria Inês, marrying , the brother of Prudente de Morais, who was later elected as a senator. For Morais, who was already an ambitious politician, the marriage to Adelaide provided an entrance into the political elite of São Paulo state. The couple had nine children. One of the daughters died at the age of 11 and another when she was just one year old. Barros also raised the illegitimate son of Prudente de Morais, born before they were married.

Barros was described by newspapers as a "virtuous" mother and wife who was "sweet and serene". Her husband became president on 15 November 1894. Prudente de Morais ended the so-called "republic of the sword" and moved fellow coffee producers into a central position of power in the country.

Death
Her husband died in December 1902. Her own poor health led her to seek medical treatment in Berlin, Germany, where she died on 8 November 1911. Her body was returned to Brazil and buried in the Saudade Cemetery of Piracicaba.

References

1848 births
1911 deaths
First ladies of Brazil